This list of medals for bravery is an index to articles about notable medals awarded for bravery or valor.
These medals, usually associated with military forces, police forces, or other public safety entities, are given to personnel who have served with gallantry, often for those who have engaged in specific acts of bravery or valor.

Bravery Medal

As a formal name in English, "Bravery Medal" may refer to:

 The Australian Bravery Medal
 The New Zealand Bravery Medal
 The Fiji Bravery Medal

Medal of Bravery or Medal of Valor

Several English-speaking nations have a medal called the "Medal of Bravery" or the "Medal of Valor", including Canada and Tanzania. The three Canadian Bravery Decorations were created in 1972, to recognize people who risked their lives to try to save or protect the lives of others: the Cross of Valour (C.V.) recognizes acts of the most conspicuous courage in circumstances of extreme peril; the Star of Courage (S.C.) recognizes acts of conspicuous courage in circumstances of great peril; and the Medal of Bravery (M.B.) recognizes acts of bravery in hazardous circumstances. Non-English speaking nations which have or had a medal usually translated into English as "Bravery Medal" or "Medal of Bravery" include:

 Albania – Medalja e Trimërisë (1945–1982) 
 Austrian Empire and Austria-Hungary – Tapferkeitsmedaille or Medal for Bravery (Austria-Hungary), awarded from (19 July 1789–1918)
 Bangladesh – Bir Sreshtha, Bir Uttam, Bir Bikram, Bir Protik (Only awarded for ultimate bravery in The 1971 Liberation War)
 Belgium – Médaille pour acte de courage, de dévouement et d’humanité 
 Bosnia and Herzegovina – Republika Srpska – Medal for Bravery, named after Gavrilo Princip
 China – Hong Kong:
 Medal for Bravery (Gold) (1997–)
 Medal for Bravery (Silver) (1997–)
 Medal for Bravery (Bronze) (1997–)
 Czechoslovakia – Československá medaile Za chrabrost před nepřítelem" (Czechoslovakian Medal for Bravery Before the Enemy) (1940-)
 German states:
 Bavaria – officially the Militär-Verdienst Medaille (Military Merit Medal), but commonly referred to as the Tapferkeitsmedaille (1794–1918)
 Saxe-Altenburg – Tapferkeitsmedaille (1915–1918)
 Hungary – Vitézségi Érem (1922–1944)
 Iran – Medal for Bravery
 Iraq – Nut al-Shujat 
 Ireland – Comhairle na Míre Gaile
 India – Param Vir Chakra 
 Montenegro – Медаља за храброст (1841–1918)
 Poland – Cross of Valour (Krzyż Walecznych) (1920-)
 Russia – За отвагу (Medal for Bravery) (1938-)
 Saudi Arabia – Nut al-Shaja'at
 Serbia:
 Medalja za hrabrost (1913–1918; 1990–)
 Medal for Bravery (1912)
 South Africa:
 Union of South Africa King's Medal for Bravery, Gold (1939–1952)
 Union of South Africa King's Medal for Bravery, Silver (1939–1952)
 Union of South Africa Queen's Medal for Bravery, Gold (1952–1961)
 Union of South Africa Queen's Medal for Bravery, Silver (1952–1961)
 Sweden:
 För tapperhet i fält (For Valour in the Field) andFör tapperhet till sjöss (For Valour at Sea) awarded in silver from 28 May 1789 to soldiers, seamen and non-commissioned officers.
 From 1806 supplemented by medals in gold for officers.
 Thailand – เหรียญกล้าหาญ (The Bravery Medal) (1941-)
 United Arab Emirates – Nut al-Shaja'at
 Yugoslavia (Kingdom) – Medalja za hrabrost (1918–1941)
 Yugoslavia (SFRY) – Medalja za hrabrost (1943–1991)

Medal of Valor

There are a number of other decorations of various countries which are customarily translated into English using other synonyms for bravery, but are occasionally translated as "bravery".  These include the Soviet Medal "for Valor" and the Israeli Medal of Valor. Medals specifically including "valor" include:

See also

 :Category:Courage awards
 Cross of Valor
 Cross of Valour (disambiguation)
 Star of Military Valour
 Lists of awards
 List of military decorations
 List of law enforcement awards and honors

References

 
Bravery